Neischnocolus is a genus of spiders in the family Theraphosidae. It was first described in 1925 by Petrunkevitch. The genus Ami was separately described in 2008, but was later discovered to be a junior synonym of Neischnocolus. Species are native to Central America and northern South America.

Description
The carapace (upper surface of the cephalothorax) is light to dark brown and hairy. The legs are also hairy, with spines except on the femora. There are no stridulatory bristles. Neischnocolus species have modified Type I urticating hairs on the abdomen, similar to those of Proshapalopus and Citharacanthus livingstoni. Males differ from other theraphosids in having one or two more-or-less conical processes on the rear-facing (retrolateral) surface of the tibia of the pedipalp; the pear-shaped palpal bulb is also different from other theraphosids, having somewhat convergent "keels" on the forward-facing (prolateral) surface. Females have very distinctive spermathecae, with paired receptacles attached to a "back-plate".

Taxonomy
The genus Ami was erected in 2008 by Fernando Pérez-Miles; the name is based on a word in the Tupí language, meaning "spider that does not spin a web". Initially six new species were placed in the genus, and Avicularia obscura was transferred to it. Ami seemed to be more closely related to the genus Proshapalopus than to other genera of the large subfamily Theraphosinae. It is also similar to the small brownish genera Cyclosternum and Reversopelma.

The six new species were A. caxiuana, named after the type locality, which means "place of many snakes" in Tupí; A. yupanquii, named after the Inca leader Tupac Yupanqui, who unified the agricultural populations of Ecuador; A. bladesi named in honor of Panamanian singer and composer Ruben Blades; A. pijaos, honoring the Pijaos, an ancient culture that populated the region of the type locality; A. amazonica, referring to the Colombian Amazonic region; and A. weinmanni, named after Dirk Weinmann, the collector of the type specimens.

In 2019, Pérez-Miles and co-workers discovered that Ami bladesi was identical to the earlier described Neischnocolus panamanus Petrunkevitch, 1925, whose holotype had been rediscovered. Accordingly, Ami was considered to be a junior synonym of Neischnocolus, and all the species were transferred to that genus.

Species
, the World Spider Catalog accepted the following species:
Neischnocolus amazonica (Jimenez & Bertani, 2008) (syn. Ami amazonica) – Colombia
Neischnocolus armihuariensis (Kaderka, 2014) (syn. Ami armihuariensis) – Peru
Neischnocolus caxiuana (Pérez-Miles, Miglio & Bonaldo, 2008) (syn. Ami caxiuana) – Brazil
Neischnocolus iquitos Kaderka, 2020 – Peru
Neischnocolus obscurus (Ausserer, 1875) (syn. Ami obscura) – Colombia
Neischnocolus panamanus Petrunkevitch, 1925 (type species) (syns. Ami bladesi, Barropelma parvior) – Costa Rica, Panama
Neischnocolus pijaos (Jimenez & Bertani, 2008) (syn. Ami pijaos) – Colombia
Neischnocolus valentinae (Almeida, Salvatierra & de Morais, 2019) (syn. Ami valentinae) – Brazil
Neischnocolus weinmanni (Pérez-Miles, 2008) (syn. Ami weinmanni) – Venezuela
Neischnocolus yupanquii (Pérez-Miles, Gabriel & Gallon, 2008) (syn. Ami yupanquii) – Ecuador

Notes

References

Theraphosidae
Theraphosidae genera